Luk Renneboog, better known as Luke Walter Jr. (22 November 1947 – New York City, 18 June 1996), was a Belgian blues singer and musician.

In 1986, he founded the group Blue Blot with Albert Szukalski. With the second album 'Bridge to your heart', the group made a breakthrough to the general public.

In 1993, they discovered that he had leukemia. Just before his death, he made the solo album Back To Normal.

1947 births
1996 deaths
20th-century Belgian male singers
20th-century Belgian singers